The U.S. House Foreign Affairs Subcommittee on Terrorism, Nonproliferation, and Trade is a standing subcommittee within the House Foreign Affairs Committee.

Jurisdiction
The subcommittee is one of two primary subcommittees with what the committee calls "functional jurisdiction", the other being the Oversight and Investigations Subcommittee. The Africa, Global Health, and Human Rights Subcommittee also enjoys functional jurisdiction, but is primarily a "regional subcommittee".

According to the committee rules, the Terrorism Subcommittee has "oversight and legislative responsibilities over the United States’ efforts to manage and coordinate international programs to combat terrorism". It also has oversight over nonproliferation matters involving nuclear, chemical, and biological weapons, as well as weapons of mass destruction in general. It also oversees international economic and trade policy; commerce with foreign countries; international investment policy. Agencies and organizations within its jurisdiction include the Overseas Private Investment Corporation, the U.S. Trade and Development Agency, and the Export-Import Bank.

Members, 115th Congress

References

External links
 Official site

Foreign Affairs Terrorism, Nonproliferation and Trade